Cynthia Tuwankotta (born 28 June 1977) is an Indonesian former badminton player who later represented Switzerland. Tuwankotta started playing badminton at aged six, and she won the junior title at her hometown Maluku when she was ten. She then selected to join Indonesia national team in 1994, and was part of the team for 6 years. In 2000, she moved to Switzerland and was part of the national team from 2000–2009. She reached a career high as world number 6 in the women's doubles world ranking. Tuwankotta competed for Indonesia at the 2000 Summer Olympics in the women's doubles event partnered with Etty Tantri. After retiring from the badminton tournament, she became a badminton coach in Switzerland and France, and also found a Tuwankotta's Badminton Coaches and Tour in Indonesia.

Achievements

Asian Championships 
Women's doubles

Southeast Asian Games 
Women's doubles

IBF World Grand Prix 
The World Badminton Grand Prix was sanctioned by the International Badminton Federation from 1983 to 2006.

Women's doubles

IBF International 
Women's doubles

Mixed doubles

References

External links 
 
 
 
 

1977 births
Living people
People from Ambon, Maluku
Sportspeople from Maluku (province)
Indonesian female badminton players
Badminton players at the 2000 Summer Olympics
Olympic badminton players of Indonesia
Competitors at the 1999 Southeast Asian Games
Southeast Asian Games gold medalists for Indonesia
Southeast Asian Games medalists in badminton
Swiss female badminton players
Badminton coaches
20th-century Indonesian women
21st-century Indonesian women